= Allan Children's Foundation =

Non-government organisation in Uganda

Allan Children’s Foundation
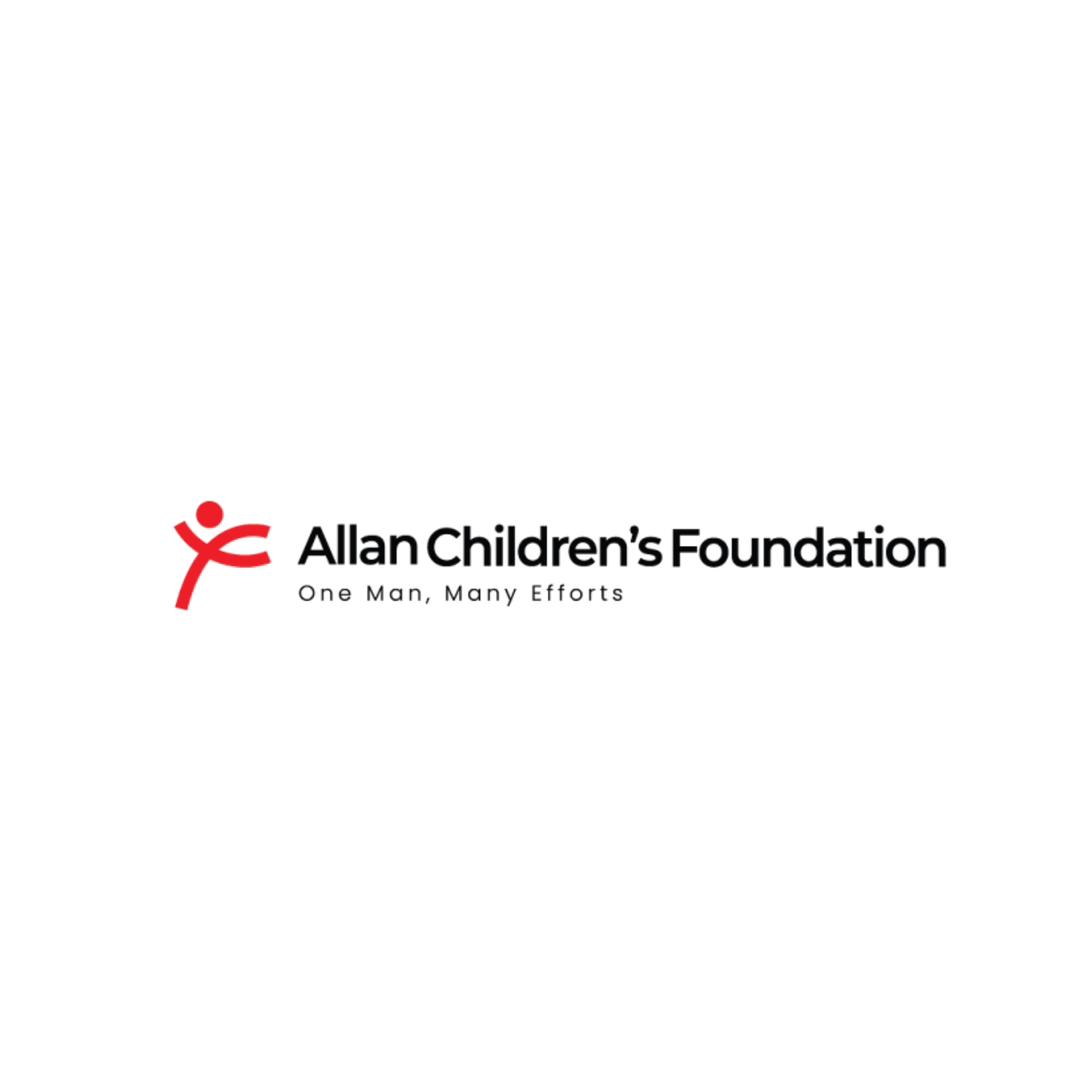
- Formation: 28 October 2019; 7 years ago
- Founder: Allan Kato
- Type: Non-Profit Organisation
- Purpose: Education & Literacy
- Location: Kampala
- Region served: Uganda

Allan Children’s Foundation is a Ugandan non-governmental organization. It was founded in 2019 and is based in East Africa (Uganda, Kampala District).

== History ==
Allan Children’s Foundation was founded in 2019 by Allan Kato. The Foundation reported providing at least 1000 children with education assistance in 2023.

== Mission ==
Allan Children’s Foundation’s motto, ‘Empowering lives through Education’, reflects its mission to address issues of poverty, healthcare, through improvements in access to and quality of education, with a focus on Uganda’s younger generations. Allan Children Foundation projects focus beyond basic educational services in order to maximise participation in a range of areas and encourage children to explore their own interests and curiosities. The organisation's objectives are to provide opportunities for underprivileged and homeless children to fully develop their physical, intellectual and creative potentials; to assist and cooperate with the individuals and organizations working for children's education and welfare; to protect children who are abused and neglected, and to restore their family relationships; and to campaign for public awareness on children's rights.

== External references ==
- Allan Children's Foundation Initiates Fundraising Campaign to Construct a Home of Hope for 150 Orphans
- Allan Children's Foundation launches campaign to build home for underprivileged children
